Andrei Vyacheslavovich Lomakin (April 3, 1964 – December 9, 2006) was a professional ice hockey player who played parts of four seasons in the NHL with the Philadelphia Flyers and Florida Panthers. He played in the Soviet Union prior to that, earning a gold medal at the 1988 Winter Olympics while a member of the Soviet national team.

Playing career 
Born in Voskresensk, he played four seasons with Khimik Voskresensk before moving to HC Dynamo Moscow. Lomakin was drafted in the 7th round, 138th overall by the Philadelphia Flyers in the 1991 NHL Entry Draft. After ten seasons in Russia, Lomakin made his NHL debut in 1991 at the age of 27. He became the first Russian player to ever play for the Flyers, playing 108 games over two seasons, from 1991–92 to 1992–93, scoring 50 points. He spent two more seasons in the NHL with the Florida Panthers, including a career-high 19 goals and 47 points in their inaugural season of 1993–94. He finished his playing career with the Frankfurt Lions of the DEL in 1996–97 at the age of 33.

Death 
Lomakin died on December 9, 2006, after long illness.

Career statistics

Regular season and playoffs

International

External links
 
Andrei Lomakin passes away

1964 births
2006 deaths
Eisbären Berlin players
Florida Panthers players
Frankfurt Lions players
HC Dynamo Moscow players
HC Fribourg-Gottéron players
HC Khimik Voskresensk players
Ice hockey players at the 1988 Winter Olympics
Olympic ice hockey players of the Soviet Union
Olympic gold medalists for the Soviet Union
People from Voskresensk
Philadelphia Flyers draft picks
Philadelphia Flyers players
Russian ice hockey left wingers
Olympic medalists in ice hockey
Medalists at the 1988 Winter Olympics
Honoured Masters of Sport of the USSR
Sportspeople from Moscow Oblast